Tom Ryan (born 1944 in Ballybrown, County Limerick, Ireland) is an Irish former hurling manager and player.  He played hurling with his local club Ballybrown and was a member of the Limerick senior inter-county team from 1973 until 1976.  Ryan later served as manager of both the Limerick and Westmeath senior inter-county teams.

Playing career

Club

Ryan played his club hurling with his local club in Ballybrown.

Inter-county

Ryan began his playing career with Limerick in the 1960s and went on as a substitute for Bernie Hartigan in the 1973 All Ireland Final which Limerick won, beating Kilkenny by 1–21 to 1–14. He started the 1974 All Ireland final as a right half back but Limerick were beaten by Kilkenny 3–19 to 1–13. He also won a National Hurling League as a player in 1971.

Managerial career

Limerick
Ryan took over as Limerick senior hurling manager from Phil Bennis in the late summer of 1993 and remained as manager until 1997. He won two Munster titles in 1994 and 1996 as a manager, and won a National Hurling League in 1997. He was removed immediately after that success following a frosty relationship with the Limerick county board officers. He was replaced as manager by Éamonn Cregan.

Westmeath
Ryan was appointed manager of the Westmeath senior hurling team in November 2003.  After two unsuccessful years in this position, he stepped down in 2005.

References

1944 births
Living people
Ballybrown hurlers
Limerick inter-county hurlers
All-Ireland Senior Hurling Championship winners
Hurling managers